Cugnot Ice Piedmont is an ice piedmont in Trinity Peninsula, about  long and between  wide, extending from Russell East Glacier to Eyrie Bay and bounded on the landward side by Louis Philippe Plateau. It was mapped from surveys by the Falkland Islands Dependencies Survey (1960–61), and named by the UK Antarctic Place-Names Committee for Nicolas-Joseph Cugnot, a French military engineer who designed and built the first full-sized vehicle propelled by its own engine (steam), in 1769.

Map
 Trinity Peninsula. Scale 1:250000 topographic map No. 5697. Institut für Angewandte Geodäsie and British Antarctic Survey, 1996.

References 

Ice piedmonts of Graham Land
Landforms of Trinity Peninsula